Khukhrain  is a village in Kapurthala district of Punjab State, India. The village is administrated by a Sarpanch. who is an elected representative.

Demography 
According to the report published by Census India in 2011, Khukhrain has 295 houses with the total population of 1,576 persons of which 860 are male and 716 females. Literacy rate of  Khukhrain is 64.89%, lower than the state average of 75.84%.  The population of children in the age group 0–6 years is 226 which is 14.34% of the total population. Child sex ratio is approximately 752, lower than the state average of 846.

Population data

References

External links
  Villages in Kapurthala
 Kapurthala Villages List

Villages in Kapurthala district